Stats Perform (formerly STATS, LLC and STATS, Inc.) is a sports data and analytics company formed through the combination of Stats and Perform.

The company is involved in sports data collection and predictive analysis for use across various sports sectors including professional team performance, digital, media, broadcast and betting. The company has also been increasingly involved in artificial intelligence and machine learning. Its clients include media outlets, sports leagues and teams, fantasy sports and sports betting services. As of 2014, the company covered 83,000 events annually from over 300 leagues and competitions.

Stats Perform is headquartered in London with other office locations in Amsterdam, Chicago, Limerick, Aveiro, Buenos Aires, Castelfranco Veneto, Beijing, Bangalore, Chennai, Düsseldorf, Graz, Istanbul, Katowice, Kuala Lampur, Madrid, Nice, Paris, Prague, Sao Paulo, and Sydney. In addition to their offices, Stats Perform have full-time staff all over the globe operating in local markets including Cape Town, Dubai, Seoul, Tokyo, and more.

History
STATS, Inc. was founded in April 1981 by John Dewan, who became the company's CEO. The company name is an acronym for "Sports Team Analysis and Tracking Systems". STATS was an outgrowth of the grassroots non-profit Project Scoresheet, a volunteer network created to collect baseball statistics.

Perform Group was originally formed in 2007 via the merger of Premium TV Limited and Inform Group. It was originally involved in content distribution, subscription, advertising and sponsorship, and technology and production.

In 2013, Perform Group acquired Opta Sports. Opta was founded in 1996 and remains part of Stats Perform.

In 2019, Stats merged with Perform Content following its sale to parent company Vista Equity Partners.

Vista Equity Partners ownership, merger with Perform Content 
In June 2014, Fox Sports and the AP sold STATS LLC to Vista Equity Partners, a private equity firm.

In early 2015, STATS acquired the wire services The Sports Network and Prozone. Vista Equity Partners also acquired Automated Insights, a company involved in using natural-language generation based on big data (including in particular, generating wire reports on sporting events from raw statistics).

In April 2019, Vista Equity Partners announced its intent to acquire Perform Content, the former sports data subsidiary of Perform Group. The company was selling the property to focus more on its sports streaming service DAZN. It was stated that DAZN Group would retain a "significant minority stake" in the surviving entity, which was to focus strongly on the use of artificial intelligence and machine learning.

On July 15, 2019, it was announced that the merged company would be known as Stats Perform, and operate under STATS CEO Carl Mergele. He stated that the company would "[harness] the power of immense amounts of sports data with unparalleled AI technology".

Partnerships with leagues and Federations 
Over its history, Stats Perform has built several long-term partnerships with global sports leagues and federations to collect and commercialise sports data. These include Premier League, WTA, FIBA, La Liga and AELTC.

As well as commercial services, Stats Perform also provides integrity services to major leagues to help in the prevention, detection and response to match manipulation.

Services Offered 
Stats Perform divides its services over four markets; Media, Big Tech, Professional Teams and Betting Operators.

Media – The company services the digital media market through its PressBox platform. PressBox is a series of content creation tools which are designed to drive fan activations and engagement.

Big Tech – The company works with the vast majority of major technology companies globally, providing them with Opta data feeds, advanced metrics and predictive analytics.

Professional Teams – Through their Pro services, Stats Perform works with sports teams to enhance performance across recruitment, match analysis and strategic planning.

Betting and Gaming – Their Bet services include live streams, ultra-fast data and detailed player data.

Opta 
Opta Index Limited was founded in 1996 to analyse Premier League football matches and was contracted by Sky Sports for their television broadcasts of the 1996–97 season. The following season, Opta became the official statistics provider for the league itself and became sponsored by Carling.

The company was sold to Perform Group in 2013 for £40 million and remains part of Stats Perform.

Importance of Artificial Intelligence 
When the merger of the two organisations was announced, CEO Carl Mergele pointed to the importance of AI technology in the future of sports and sports media. Since that point, the organisation has continued to invest in technologies, patents and models in the AI area. As a result, they've been able to deliver a series of products and services from player tracking and content creation to personalisation and predictive analytics.

References

External links 
 

Sports records and statistics
Former News Corporation subsidiaries
Companies based in Chicago
American companies established in 1981
Sports mass media in the United States
Data companies